Frédéric Ouvret (born 15 May 1970) is a French former professional footballer. He played as a midfielder.

See also
Football in France
List of football clubs in France

References

External links
 Frédéric Ouvret profile at chamoisfc79.fr

1970 births
Living people
French footballers
Association football midfielders
Red Star F.C. players
Chamois Niortais F.C. players
Ligue 2 players
Toulouse Fontaines Club players
Stade Montois (football) players